Hong Kong competed at the 1984 Summer Paralympics in Stoke Mandeville, Great Britain and New York City, United States. 25 competitors from Hong Kong won 17 medals including 3 gold, 5 silver and 9 bronze and finished 27th in the medal table.

See also 
 Hong Kong at the Paralympics
 Hong Kong at the 1984 Summer Olympics

References 

1984
1984 in Hong Kong sport
Nations at the 1984 Summer Paralympics